The Little Rincon Mountains are a small range of mountains, lying to the east of the Rincon Mountains, at Tucson, of eastern Pima County, Arizona. The range is located in northwest Cochise County and is part of the western border of the San Pedro River and Valley, the major valley and river of western Cochise County. The river is northward flowing to meet the Gila River; its headwaters are south of the US-Mexico border in northern Sonora. A small part of the Little Rincon range's southwest lies in Pima County.

Description

The Little Rincon Mountains are a 15 mi long range, that trends southwest to northeast. It is a linear range, about 8 mi wide and is created by a canyon that separates it from the eastern flank of the mostly north–south, central block of the Rincon Mountains. The canyon is named Paige Canyon, and the major peaks of the range lie near its headwaters in the southwest.

San Pedro Valley
In the San Pedro Valley, the Little Rincon's lie directly on the course of the San Pedro River, and force an excursion of the river around the mountain range's southeast, east, and northeast flank. To the north the valley narrows between mountain ranges; to the south, the San Pedro River flows mostly due north from the Mexican border, though trends northwesterly. The San Pedro Valley also widens extensively in some locales associated with perimeter mountain ranges, or low hill regions. Various tributary washes enter this wider valley region. The largest tributary enters from the southwest, the Babocomari River, from north of the Huachuca Mountains and south of the Whetstone's. The Babocomari drains from the Canelo Hills between the northwest Huachuca's and the eastern, high-elevation Santa Rita Mountains.

References

External links
 Forest Hill (peak), trails.com, (coord)

Mountain ranges of Cochise County, Arizona
Mountain ranges of Pima County, Arizona
Madrean Sky Islands mountain ranges
San Pedro Valley (Arizona)
Mountain ranges of Arizona